{{DISPLAYTITLE:C18H22O4}}
The molecular formula C18H22O4 (molar mass : 302.36 g/mol) may refer to:

 Enterodiol, a lignan
 Masoprocol, an antineoplastic drug
 Nordihydroguaiaretic acid